Athnanangle Bridge is situated  north-east of Aghabullogue village, and  north of Coachford village. The bridge is located at the meeting point of the townlands of Clonmoyle East (which lies within the civil parish and Catholic parish of Aghabullogue) and Killeenleigh (which lies within the civil parish and Catholic parish of Donoughmore). The Ordnance Survey name book (c. 1840) names it as Athnanagul.

A river ford, crossing the Dripsey River, existed here until recent times, and is depicted as 'Athnanangle Ford' and 'Stepping Stones' on the OS 1841 surveyed map. This was replaced by Athnanangle Bridge, which had been constructed by the beginning of the twentieth century.

Milner (1975) describes Athnanangle as an ancient ford which tradition associated with St. Olan of Aghabullogue and St. Lachteen of Donoughmore, being the meeting place where they marked the dividing line between their respective parishes of Aghabullogue and Donoughmore. The Irish Tourist Association survey of 1944 gives some local folklore, as to a 'misunderstanding' between the two Saints on the question of division of parochial territories. St. Lachteen, believing a portion of his territory to be wrongfully obtained by St. Olan, is said to have remarked 'there will always be a robber at Aghabullogue', with St. Olan, considering his neighbour difficult to deal with, replying that 'Donoughmore will always have its mad dogs'. Local tradition had it that any dog showing signs of hysteria was to be faced towards Donoughmore.

Many surviving bridges in mid-Cork are originally constructed of stone, arched in shape, and late eighteenth or early nineteenth century in date. Athnanangle Bridge does not fit within this category, being of later construction date.

See also
Clonmoyle House
Clonmoyle Mill
Leader's Aqueduct
Cottage House, Clonmoyle
Luskin's Bridge

References

External links
 1841 surveyed OS map (maps.osi.ie)
 1901 surveyed OS map (maps.osi.ie)
 acrheritage.info

Bridges in County Cork